The Cyclone is a wooden roller coaster located at Lakeside Amusement Park in Denver, Colorado. Designed by Edward A. Vettel, the coaster opened in 1940. Following the closure of Blue Streak at Conneaut Lake Park, Cyclone is the last remaining roller coaster ever designed by Edward A. Vettel.

Ride experience 
The coaster starts by turning right, then turning left before entering the lift hill. After turning left while dropping, the coaster goes up another hill and turns left before dropping again. After turning left over two different hills, the ride goes over a bunny hop which doubles as a near-miss moment for riders. The ride then does one airtime hill before turning around and doing 3 final bunny hops before turning right into the station. These sharp turns and fast paced speed intrigue people. The coaster's station braking system is operated by two sets of manual handbrakes, rather than  a hydraulically-operated system found in most roller coasters.

Awards 
Cyclone has been awarded the ACE Classic Coaster award, which is given to historical roller coasters by the American Coaster Enthusiasts.

References 

Roller coasters in Colorado